Heddiw (English: Today) was a television news programme in the Welsh language, broadcast by BBC Television between 1961 and 1982. The programme ended when all Welsh-language programming was transferred to the new channel S4C.

Annie Davies was the show's first producer (and later editor). Presenters of the programme included Owen Edwards, Robin Jones and Sulwyn Thomas.

Hywel Gwynfryn, who later had his own chat show, recounted how he was discovered by the Heddiw production team while working in a Cardiff pub.

References

Welsh television news shows
Welsh-language television shows
1961 British television series debuts
1982 British television series endings
1960s British television series
1970s British television series
1980s British television series
1960s Welsh television series
1970s Welsh television series
1980s Welsh television series